The following are international rankings of Vietnam.

Cities
Hanoi, ECA International: Most expensive cities 2015, ranked 198 of 250 and 59 out of 63 in Asia Pacific region.
Ho Chi Minh City, ECA International: Most expensive cities 2015, ranked 201
Ho Chi Minh City, Urban area population 2015 projection, ranked 39
Hanoi, Urban area population 2015 projection, ranked 109

Demographics 

 2022 Population ranked 15 out of 195
 Population Density ranked 49 out of 248
Total immigrant population as of 2006 ranked 156 out of 192 countries

Economy

 IMD International: World Competitiveness Scoreboard 2009, not ranked among top 57 economies
 Heritage Foundation/The Wall Street Journal: 2012 Index of Economic Freedom ranked 136 out of 179
 World Economic Forum: Global Competitiveness Report 2012-2013, ranked 75 out of 144 countries
World Economic Forum Global Competitiveness Report 2011, ranked 65 out of 142

Education 

 2018 Programme for International Student Assessment - Mathematics ranked 24 out of 79
 2018 Programme for International Student Assessment - Science ranked 4 out of 79
 2018 Programme for International Student Assessment - Reading ranked 13 out of 78
 Literacy rate ranked 93 out of 195

Environment

 Yale University Center for Environmental Law and Policy and Columbia University Center for International Earth Science Information Network: 2008 Environmental Performance Index, ranked 76 out of 149 countries

Geography

 Total area ranked 65 out of 233 countries

Globalization

KOF: Index of Globalization 2011, 125 out of 208
A.T. Kearney/Foreign Policy Magazine: Globalization Index 2006, not ranked

Health 

 Body mass index ranked 183 out of 196
 Healthcare ranked 62 out of 91
 Life expectancy ranked 77 out of 194
 Obesity ranked 191 out of 191 (world least fattest countries)
 Suicide rate ranked 114 out of 183

Industry
OICA automobile production 2007, ranked 46 out of 51 countries

Military

Institute for Economics and Peace 2011 Global Peace Index ranked 30 out of 153

Political

 Transparency International: Corruption Perceptions Index 2011, ranked 112 out of 183 countries
 Reporters Without Borders: Worldwide Press Freedom Index 2011-2012, ranked 172 out of 179 countries
The Economist Democracy Index 2007, ranked 149 out of 167 countries

Safety 

 Global Peace Index ranked 44 out of 163
 Global Terrorism Index ranked 85 out of 163

Society

United Nations Development Programme  Human Development Index 2011, ranked 128 out of 187
 The Economist: Quality-of-Life Index 2005, ranked 61 out of 111 countries
University of Leicester Satisfaction with Life Index 2006, ranked 95 out of 178 countries
World Giving Index: 2011, ranked 125 out of 153 countries

Technology
Number of mobile phones in use ranked 13
Number of broadband Internet users ranked 33
Economist Intelligence Unit: E-readiness 2008, ranked 65 out of 70 countries
World Economic Forum Networked Readiness Index 2008-2009, ranked 70 out of 134 countries
United Nations: e-Government Readiness Index, 2008, not ranked among top 50 countries

Tourism

World Tourism Organization: World Tourism rankings 2007, ranked 46

Transportation

Total rapid transit systems not ranked among top 53

See also

Lists of countries
Lists by country
List of international rankings

References

Vietnam